Konjsko is a village in the Resen Municipality of North Macedonia. Located on the western shore of Lake Prespa, Konjsko is just east of the Albania–North Macedonia border, with the village of Tuminec being the nearest settlement on the opposite side of the border. Konjsko is also the nearest settlement to the island of Golem Grad.

Demographics
As of the 2021 census, Konjsko had 13 residents with the following ethnic composition:
Macedonians 11
Persons for whom data are taken from administrative sources 2

In the 2002 census, Konjsko had three permanent residents.

References

Villages in Resen Municipality